Aleksandr Aleksandrovich Kleshchenko (born 2 November 1995) is a Russian professional football player who plays for Rodina Moscow.

Club career
Kleshchenko played for FC Alania Vladikavkaz in the 2012–13 Russian Cup game against FC Tyumen on 27 September 2012.

Kleshchenko made his debut for the main squad of FC Kuban Krasnodar on 23 September 2015 in a Russian Cup game against FC Shinnik Yaroslavl.

Kleshchenko made his debut in the Russian Football Premier League for FC Kuban Krasnodar on 24 October 2015 in a game against FC Mordovia Saransk.

Kleshchenko signed a two-year contract with FC Tobol on 30 January 2019. On 5 July 2019, Kleshchenko left Tobol by mutual consent.

On 11 February 2020, Kleshchenko signed for FC Ordabasy.

In January 2022, Kleshchenko signed for Turan before leaving the club by mutual agreement in June 2022.

References

External links
 

1995 births
Sportspeople from Vladikavkaz
Living people
Russian footballers
Russia youth international footballers
Association football midfielders
FC Spartak Vladikavkaz players
FC Kuban Krasnodar players
FC Tom Tomsk players
FC Tobol players
FC Yenisey Krasnoyarsk players
FC Ordabasy players
FC Turan players
Russian Premier League players
Russian First League players
Russian Second League players
Kazakhstan Premier League players
Russian expatriate footballers
Russian expatriate sportspeople in Kazakhstan
Expatriate footballers in Kazakhstan